Siping may refer to:

 Siping (rubber), process of cutting thin slits across a rubber surface

China 
 Siping, Jilin (四平市) formerly Sipingjie
 Siping Road Station (四平路站), in Shanghai
 Siping, Liaoning (四平镇), town in Pulandian

See also

Sipe (disambiguation)